The 1998 Ondrej Nepela Memorial was the 6th edition of an annual senior-level international figure skating competition held in Bratislava, Slovakia. It took place between September 25 and 27, 1998. Skaters competed in four disciplines: men's singles, ladies' singles, pair skating, and ice dancing. The competition is named for 1972 Olympic gold medalist Ondrej Nepela.

Results

Men

Ladies

Pairs

Ice dancing

External links
 6th Ondrej Nepela Memorial

Ondrej Nepela Memorial, 1998
Ondrej Nepela Memorial
Ondrej Nepela Memorial, 1998